Wu Ha is Taiwanese Mandopop artist Will Pan's third Mandarin studio album.  It was released by Universal Music Taiwan on 3 September 2004. This album features a duet, "快樂崇拜" (Adoration to Happiness) with Taiwanese singer Angela Zhang, which was also released in her second album Aurora under label Linfair Records. The music and lyrics for "我讓你走了" (Letting You Go) were written by Taiwanese singer-songwriter Tank.

The track "Wu Ha" was listed at number 36 on Hit Fm Taiwan's Hit Fm Annual Top 100 Singles Chart (Hit-Fm年度百首單曲) for 2004.

Release and promotion 
Wu Ha was supposed to release in June 2004, but was delayed until September. The pre-sale activity for the album started on September 15, 2004, with those who ordered receiving a limited edition poster and postcard.

While filming the music video for Wu Ha, Pan injured his knee. Despite the injury, he continued to dance hard in subsequent performances, causing it to worsen. Pan sought medical treatment after his performance at the Golden Eagle Festival, and he was advised to get knee surgery. Pan's agency halted all promotions for the album due to the event.

Track listing

Music video
 "Wu Ha"
 "快樂崇拜" (Adoration to Happiness) – feat Angela Chang

Notes

References

External links
  Will Pan discography@Universal Music Taiwan

2004 albums
Will Pan albums
Universal Music Taiwan albums